Shiv Charan Gupta (born 3 March 1925 in Udhampur, Jammu and Kashmir – died 15 March 2008 Udhampur, Jammu and Kashmir) is an Indian politician and member of the Bharatiya Janata Party. Gupta was a member of the Jammu and Kashmir Legislative Assembly from the Udhampur constituency in Udhampur district.

References 

Bharatiya Janata Party politicians from Jammu and Kashmir
1925 births
2008 deaths
21st-century Indian politicians
India MPs 1962–1967
Lok Sabha members from Delhi
Jammu and Kashmir MLAs 1977–1983
Jammu and Kashmir MLAs 1996–2002